There have been three baronetcies created for persons with the surname Chichester, one in the Baronetage of England and two in the Baronetage of the United Kingdom. Only the 1641 creation is extant.

Chichester baronets, of Raleigh (1641)
The Chichester Baronetcy, of Raleigh in the County of Devon, was created in the Baronetage of England on 4 August 1641 for John Chichester (1623–1667).

1st Baronet
John Chichester (1623–1667) was MP for Barnstaple, Devon. Raleigh was a manor held by the Chichester family in the parish of Pilton, near Barnstaple. He was the son of Sir Robert Chichester, knight, (1579–1627) of Raleigh (whose monument with effigies exists in Pilton Church) by his second wife Ursula Hill. Sir Robert was the son of Sir John Chichester by his wife Ann Denys, daughter of Sir Robert Denys (d.1592), MP, of Holcombe Burnell, Devon. Sir John was the eldest surviving son of Sir John Chichester (d.1569), knight, of Raleigh, whose elaborate monument (without effigy) exists in Pilton Church, who was also father of Arthur Chichester, 1st Baron Chichester of Belfast (1563-1624/5), and of Edward Chichester, 1st Viscount Chichester (1568–1648), of Eggesford, Devon, ancestor of the Marquesses of Donegall (see this title for more information on this branch of the family).

Succession

The first Baronet's eldest son, John Chichester, the second Baronet, died childless at an early age and was succeeded by his younger brother, Arthur Chichester, the third Baronet. He too represented Barnstaple in the House of Commons. On his death in 1718 the title passed to his son, John, the fourth Baronet. He too sat as MP for Barnstaple. His son, John, the fifth Baronet, and his son, John, the sixth Baronet, both served as High Sheriff of Devon (from 1753 to 1754 and from 1788 to 1789 respectively). The latter died unmarried in 1808 and was succeeded by his first cousin once removed, Arthur, the seventh Baronet whose seat was Youlston Park, Shirwell, Devon. He was the grandson of Reverend William Chichester, younger son of the fourth Baronet. He was High Sheriff of Devon between 1816 and 1817. His son, Arthur, the eighth Baronet, was a Deputy Lieutenant and Justice of the Peace for Devon. He was succeeded by his eldest son, Edward, the ninth Baronet. He was a Rear-Admiral in the Royal Navy, Naval Aide-de-Camp to Queen Victoria and King Edward VII and Admiral Superintendent of the Naval Establishment in Gibraltar. As of 2008 the title is held by his great-grandson (the baronetcy having descended from father to son), James, the twelfth Baronet, who succeeded in 2007. The aviator and world-circumnavigating sailor Sir Francis Chichester was the son of Reverend Charles Chichester, seventh son of the eighth Baronet.
Sir John Chichester, 1st Baronet (23 April 1623 – 2 November 1667)
Sir John Chichester, 2nd Baronet (c. 1658-16 September 1680) (son)
Sir Arthur Chichester, 3rd Baronet (c. 1662-3 February 1718) (brother)
Sir John Chichester, 4th Baronet (2 June 1689 – 2 September 1740) (son)
Sir John Chichester, 5th Baronet (26 March 1721 – 18 December 1784) (son)
Sir John Chichester, 6th Baronet (c. 1752-30 September 1808) (son)
Sir Arthur Chichester, 7th Baronet (25 April 1790 – 30 May 1842) (cousin)
Sir Arthur Chichester, 8th Baronet (4 October 1822 – 13 July 1898) (son)
Rear-Admiral Sir Edward Chichester, 9th Baronet (20 November 1849 – 17 September 1906) (son)
Sir Edward George Chichester, 10th Baronet (22 January 1888 – 26 September 1940) (son), Commander, Royal Navy Naval Brigade. He fought in the second Boer War, most notably in the siege of Ladysmith.
Sir (Edward) John Chichester, 11th Baronet (14 April 1916 – 14 May 2007) (son). Son of Sir Edward George Chichester, 10th Baronet, by his wife Phyllis Dorothy Compton, educated at Radley College, Abingdon, and at the Royal Military College, Sandhurst. He was a Lieutenant in the Royal Navy Volunteer Reserve and a captain in the service of the Royal Scots Fusiliers and fought in the Second World War. After the war he was King's Messenger between 1947 and 1950 and worked for Imperial Chemical Industries between 1950 and 1960. Chichester married the Hon. Anne Rachel Pearl, daughter of John Douglas-Scott-Montagu, 2nd Baron Montagu of Beaulieu, and Alice Pearl Crake, on 23 September 1950. They had two sons and three daughters. He died in May 2007, aged 91, and was succeeded in the baronetcy by his eldest son, James.
Sir James Henry Edward Chichester, 12th Baronet (born 15 October 1951) (son)

The heir apparent is Edward John Chandos-Pole Chichester (born 1991)

Chichester baronets, of Green Castle (1821)
The Chichester Baronetcy, of Green Castle in the County of Donegal, was created in the Baronetage of the United Kingdom on 13 September 1821 for Arthur Chichester, MP for Carrickfergus and Belfast. The title became extinct on his death in 1847.
Sir Arthur Chichester, 1st Baronet (died 1847)

Chichester baronets, of Arlington Court (1840)
The Chichester Baronetcy, of Arlington Court in the County of Devon, was created in the Baronetage of the United Kingdom on 7 September 1840 for John Chichester, of Arlington, Liberal Member of Parliament for Barnstaple 1831–1840. The title became extinct on the death of the second Baronet in 1881. His widow later married her late husband's distant cousin and neighbour, Sir Arthur Chichester, 8th Baronet of Youlston Park, Shirwell, Devon. The 2nd baronet's unmarried daughter and heiress, Rosalie C. Chichester (d. 1949), bequeathed the Arlington family seat to the nation in 1949.
Sir John Palmer Bruce Chichester, 1st Baronet (died 10 December 1851)
Sir Alexander Palmer Bruce Chichester, 2nd Baronet (24 December 1842 – 25 January 1881)

See also
Marquess of Donegall

Notes

References

Kidd, Charles, Williamson, David (editors). Debrett's Peerage and Baronetage (1990 edition). New York: St Martin's Press, 1990,

Further reading
Chichester, Sir Alexander Bruce Palmer, Bart., History of the Family of Chichester from AD 1086 to 1870, published 1870. The author was of the Chichester Baronets, 1840 creation of Arlington Court.

Baronetcies in the Baronetage of England
Extinct baronetcies in the Baronetage of the United Kingdom
Chichester family
1641 establishments in England
1821 establishments in the United Kingdom